Dmitri Valeryevich Sannikov (born 19 January 1983) is a former Russian professional football player.

Club career
He played 8 seasons in the Russian Football National League for FC Dynamo Bryansk, FC Volgar-Gazprom Astrakhan and FC Salyut Belgorod.

External links
 
 

1983 births
Living people
Russian footballers
Association football midfielders
FC Dynamo Bryansk players
FC Volgar Astrakhan players
FC Salyut Belgorod players
FC Avangard Kursk players